Concrete barrier may refer to:
 Alaska Barrier
 Bremer barrier
 Traffic barrier
 Concrete step barrier
 Constant-slope barrier
 F-Shape barrier
 Jersey barrier